Jiří Štoček (born 10 May 1977) is a Czech chess grandmaster. He won the Czech Chess Championship in 2011.

Chess career
Born in 1977, Štoček earned his international master (IM) title in 1994 and his grandmaster (GM) title in 1998. He won the Czech Chess Championship in 2011 with a score of 6/9 (+3–0=6), half a point ahead of runner-up Jan Krejčí. He is the No. 4 ranked Czech player as of September 2018.

Personal life
Štoček is married to IM Zuzana Štočková.

References

External links

1977 births
Living people
Chess grandmasters
Czech chess players
People from Ostrov (Karlovy Vary District)